Jo Yun-seo (born January 4, 1993) is a South Korean actress.

Filmography

Film

Television series

Awards and nominations

References

External links
 
 

21st-century South Korean actresses
South Korean television actresses
South Korean film actresses
1993 births
Living people
People from Gimcheon